John Pickard (born 2 November 1977 in London) is an English actor, best known for playing David Porter in the BBC sitcom 2point4 Children, and Dominic Reilly (brother of Tony Hutchinson, played by Pickard's own brother Nick Pickard) in Channel 4's Hollyoaks.

Career
He trained at the Sylvia Young Theatre School.

He has performed on stage, in films and on TV.

Between 1990 and 1991, he appeared in Series 13 and 14 of the children's BBC drama series Grange Hill as the character Neil Timpson.

In 1991 he was cast as David Porter, alongside Gary Olsen and Belinda Lang, in the BBC1 sitcom 2point4 Children, which ran for eight series until 1999.

He then joined Hollyoaks in 2005 as Dominic Reilly, and left in 2010. 

In 2008, he was cast as Doctor Who companion Thomas Brewster for Doctor Who Audio Dramas in The Haunting of Thomas Brewster. Due to this and other audio dramas, he attended Gallifrey One in February 2010, an annual North American science fiction convention in Los Angeles, California.

Theatre
 2016 - Sir Toby Belch in Twelfth Night - (Grassroots Shakespeare London, Leicester Square Theatre)
 2012 – Beauty and the Beast – (Newark Palace Theatre, Newark-on-Trent)
 2003 – Wishy Washy – Aladdin – The Playhouse, Weston-super-Mare

As well as pantomimes, he has also performed as George in Same Time, Next Year (at Ashcroft Theatre, Croydon), James in Writebites (at Upstairs at The Bell), Trevor in Aphrodite Blugs (at New End Theatre, Hampstead), Ben in Stroke Me (at Finborough Theatre, Earls Court), Colin in Saved (at Octagon Theatre, Bolton), Romeo in Romeo and Juliet (Stafford Gatehouse Theatre) and Morton in An Enemy of the People (at Playhouse Theatre).

Filmography

Television

Films

References

External links

English male soap opera actors
Living people
1977 births
Male actors from London
Alumni of the Sylvia Young Theatre School